Douglass is a community on the north side of Memphis, Tennessee. Douglass was named after Frederick Douglass, who was admired by William Rush-Plummer, the one-time owner of the land (approximately ) where the Douglass neighborhood currently stands.

Geography
Douglass borders Hyde Park and Hollywood and is surrounded by railroad tracks to the north, south and west. South of Douglass is the neighborhood of Binghampton, to the southeast is Nutbush.

History

Beginnings
 William Rush-Plummer was born into a life of slavery in the Southern States in America. He was the only son of a white slave master, William Rush Sr. and his mother, a slave from Africa. Mrs. Rush demanded of her husband, that young William Rush Jr. not be given the Rush family name. As a result, William Rush Senior, modified his son's name giving him a hyphenated last name. William Jr. was renamed, William Rush-Plummer.

Slavery in the South was eventually abolished. When that time arrived, slaves were promised  and a mule. Although many newly freed slaves did not receive the promise at that time, William Rush Sr. gave William Rush-Plummer  in North Memphis, Tennessee. He turned his land into a community and name it after Fredrick Douglass, a man he had come to befriend and admire.

William Rush-Plummer was ordained in his young adult years and began to develop the land now known as the Douglass Community in Memphis, Tennessee after his family was released from slavery (see  and a mule). Plummer had a strong resemblance to his father and a similar proper speech pattern (with a heavy southern dialect). He began opening many churches on his land including St. Paul Missionary Baptist Church (Need More Missionary Baptist Church), St. Stephens MB Church, St. John MB Church, St. Charles MB Church and at least three other local churches that were later sold to local Pastors and their congregations.

From the very beginning, Christianity played a vital role in the Plummer family and the lives of families in the Douglass Community due to William Rush-Plummer's vision. In 1900, William Rush Plummer and his associates had a vision that a church was needed for the community. Under a bush arbor in Douglass Park, the first church known as "Need More" was established. Plummer, known as “Father Plummer” deliberately gave the church this name because he felt it needed more of everything: shelter, chairs, and people.

Saint Paul Missionary Baptist Church
In 1902, ‘Need More Church’ moved to a new location for worship on Ellington Street and was given a new name, "Saint Paul Missionary Baptist Church". Rev. Plummer served as the church's first official pastor. He was succeeded by Bolton, followed by Anderson. The church moved in 1905 to its present location at 1543 Brookins Street. Memphis, Tennessee. Although Rev. William Rush-Plummer was among the Missionary Baptist Denomination, he gave each of the churches that he built, Catholic Church names.

Rev. J.E. Ferguson became the fourth pastor of the church on the third Sunday in June 1931. He resided in a home directly across the street from the church. Realizing that education had to be perpetuated in the community, Saint Paul Missionary Baptist Church allowed Douglass High School to hold classes in the early 1900s when the school was blown away by the "Great Storm". In 1935, the School burned to the ground and once again, St. Paul Missionary Baptist Church opened its doors. Ferguson permitted the school to hold classes under the leadership of Mrs. Susie Crawford, principal and later Mr. Lucky Sharpe until the new school was built the following year. To further serve the community, St. Paul was, also, used as a social center for feeding the poor. Rev. Ferguson served as pastor of St. Paul Missionary Baptist Church for 60 years until his death on April 16, 1991.

Harry Davis, a resident of the Douglass community on Oriole Street, was elected as Pastor, on the first Sunday in July 1991. He is currently the Pastor. Under his leadership, St Paul Missionary Baptist Church, was re-documented under the name of St. Paul (Douglass) Missionary Baptist Church under the direction of Pastor Harry Davis and is a landmark in the “Historic Douglass Community.”

Over the years, through several generations, the name ‘Rush’ began to fade. New generations unaware of the family's history simply stopped using the full last name in the mid-1900s. Today the Plummer family seldom uses the name Rush, unless historical matters are being discussed. The Plummer family's official last name, although it may not show up on their birth certificates is Rush-Plummer.

Church of the Living God, Missionary Baptist Church 

Pastor Maggie-Judith A. Fluker-Campbell, (Pastor Maggie Campbell) is the great-granddaughter of William Rush-Plummer and the granddaughter of Rev. Plummer's daughter, Evangelist Maggie B. Plummer-Trout, a faithful member of Pentecostal Church of God in Christ. Her husband was Willie Trout Sr. with whom she had a son, Willie Harold Trout Jr.

Evangelist Maggie Plummer insisted on the day Pastor Maggie Campbell was born that she be named after her. When her mother, Evelyn Fluker-Williams refused, initially naming her Judith A. Fluker, Plummer wrote the name Maggie in the margin of the birth certificate form followed by a dash[-] next to the name Judith, which led to her first name to this day as Maggie-Judith. Her mother Evelyn Fluker-Williams and her father Willie Harold Trout Jr. never changed it.

Pastor Maggie Campbell has been a member of St. Paul ‘Douglass’ Missionary Baptist Church since birth. She was baptized at the church at the approximate age of 12 years. She was trained by her grandmother and members of her family in Evangelism since her teen years. She accepted the calling on her life at the age of 13 years while attending St. Paul Missionary Baptist Church under the late J. E. Ferguson.

Pastor Maggie Campbell left Memphis in 1985 and established residents in California while serving on active duty in the United States Navy where she had the opportunity to travel around the world. She established her first ministry in support of women and children in 1993 in Oakland, California.

Pastor Maggie Campbell lives in San Diego, California. She officially established an official covenant partnership between St. Paul Douglass Missionary Baptist church and her California-based Maggie Campbell Ministries on December 18, 2005. She became the first woman in her family's history to become an ordained Pastor. She was ordained on Friday, October 13, 2006, in Southern California. Shortly after her ordination Pastor Maggie Campbell and her husband, Alvin Campbell established a new church in Palmdale, California and dedicated it to her great grandfather, the late William Rush-Plummer called, ‘Church of the Living God’, www.churchlivinggod.com on February 4, 2009. They have continued their affiliation and ministry partnership with St. Paul Douglass Missionary Baptist Church. Alvin and Pastor Maggie Campbell opened the ‘Church of the Living God’ (Missionary Baptist) in memory of Pastor Maggie's great-grandfather Rev. William Rush-Plummer where Women in Ministry Leadership receive specialized training and Official Ordination with a goal to plant more churches to continue to edify the Word of God. Pastor Maggie has have assisted graduates of the Women in Ministry Training Institute with establishing churches and ministries in California, New York, and Chattanooga, Tennessee 

Missionary Baptist Association established

In September 2010, Pastor Maggie Campbell established the “Missionary Baptist Association” (MBA), In support of Women in Ministry Leadership. One of the purposes the MBA is to bring together churches with like faith and aspirations to fellowship with one another within the MBA in California and nationwide, to encourage non-denominational churches to join with the Missionary Baptist Church family, to organize retreats and reunions as well. The Missionary Baptist Association later became the "Annual Women's Conference" which is held annually in May between Mother's Day and Memorial Day.

The Annual Women's Conference

The Women's Conference welcomes women of all ages, religious backgrounds, and non-religious affiliations.  The purpose: To aid women in healing and to deal with the adversities of everyday life. The Women's Conference, through the Church of the Living God [CLG], strives to inspire, motivate, educate and support women including with their education and career aspirations. CLG believes women should support one another's efforts, goals, and aspirations. Mature women should reach out to the younger women to help teach them life skills and the younger women should embrace our mature women who are full of wisdom to help lead and guide them along the way.
 
The Women's Conference cover the topics that are important to women that are oftentimes not discussed in Church services such as, but not limited to: Forgiveness, the Power of Prayer, Alternative Lifestyles, Sex outside of Marriage, Pro-life / Pro-choice issues, God's Covenant of Healing, Entrepreneurship, personal and professional growth, women in ministry leadership and so much more. No one understands the issues of women more than other women.
 
The Women's Conference includes 3 days of praise, worship, inspirational music, pastoral sermons, motivational speakers, musical celebrations, fellowship, networking opportunities for women, breakfast, receptions, and dinner.

Pastor Maggie Campbell Accepts the Call to the Office of Bishop

The Church of the Living God and its affiliate churches and ministries collectively congratulated Pastor Maggie Campbell on her acceptance of the Call to the Office of Bishop on May 7, 2013. Hereinafter, she was officially addressed as, "Bishop Maggie Campbell". http://conta.cc/17oFkXL

Bishop Campbell has worked hard - following in her great grandfather's footsteps William Rush-Plummer for more than 10 years to equip many women and some men to succeed in ministry. She has continued to work for years as the Overseer of churches and ministries, have helped graduates to plant new churches in New York, Tennessee, and California. She has staffed many existing churches in the Antelope Valley in California and several locations outside of the State with newly ordained, trained and equipped Women of God.

As the professor over the 'Women in Ministry Leadership Training Institute', Bishop Campbell has taught women who are now Pastors, Ministers, Evangelists, and Missionaries; several of which are senior pastors or associate pastors at churches in the Antelope Valley as well as various cities across the United States.

She is the first female Pastor in her family of male pastors dating back to the 1800s and is therefore now the first woman to be called to the Office of Bishop in her family. The duties and responsibilities of which she is required to do, she has been doing for many years prior to her official acceptance date of May 7, 2013.

Bishop Campbell's new status opens the doors for many Women in Ministry across the country and within the Rush-Plummer and Fluker families. She is obviously an intelligent woman with multiple gifts that she uses to continue to edify the Word of God and for the Body of Christ. A role model to women and teen girls, she is a woman of God who has put in an extreme amount of hard work. She has shown qualities that she openly shares with all Women in Ministry who are willing, ready and able to do what God has called them to do as well.

Bishop Campbell's dedication and perseverance has manifested itself into one of the best 'Women in Ministry Leadership Training Institutes' in America. It continues to grow each year. We all should be proud of her. Many women seek her guidance and the opportunity to train within the programs she teaches because they know she will give more than 100% of herself to making sure they receive what they need to succeed. It all began in the Douglass Community in Memphis, Tennessee - Founded by her great grandfather, William Rush-Plummer.

Education
The Douglass community is home to Douglass Elementary School on Ash Street. Since the school was built through early 1963-64 school year, the Douglass community also had a Junior High School for grades 7–9 as well as a high school grades 10–12. In the mid-1970s students passing from the 6th grade into Junior high were bussed to Gragg Junior High School on Jackson Avenue right outside the Douglass community where the student body was initially completely caucasian students. When students passed from the 9th grade to the 10th, they were bussed to Craigmont High School within the Raleigh community. The Raleigh community was a newly built community with a brand new high school with little to no windows. It resembled a prison from the outside. Within this school, various nationalities came together under a staff of caucasian teachers who were not equipped and experienced to teach African American or multiethnic children. Shortly thereafter, students were given the option of returning to their original schools, such as Douglass High School when they entered the 10th grade. Not all students returned to Douglass High School. Many remained at Craigmont High School in the North Memphis, Raleigh community.

Douglass Community has a Community Center on Ash Street were full-time and Directors and part-time workers of the community center where employed over the years. One of the most successful directors was Terry E. Fluker Sr., a graduate of the original Douglass High School with a full scholarship to Alcorn State University for baseball. Terry returned to Memphis after attending the University at Alcorn in Spring 1977. Becoming the Director of the Douglass Community Center from 2000 to 2014. He retired on January 14, 2014.

While in high school Terry Fluker Sr. lead Douglass High School to the 1973 District Championship, where he scored 14 points in the last quarter with a unique left-handed jump shot. He was an outstanding player on the school's baseball team as well and currently plays in age 40 years older [MABL] adult baseball leagues. He currently has 2 national championship rings for the years 2005 and 2006 from this league. Terry was inducted to the Alcorn State University Sports Hall Fame in the sport of baseball inducted in 2011.

In July 2019, Terry was awarded an 'Outstanding Volunteer Service Award' from the Douglass National Alumni Corporation, J. D. Springer Award, at their 41st convention held in Long Beach, California July 11-14, 2019. His volunteer service includes 4 years as a volunteer coach for Douglass High School baseball team. Terry helped secure donations for the team, coordinated old school vs. new school basketball games, and recruited the players. Recent alumni players played in July 2018.

Douglass High School
The original Douglass High School served the neighborhood in 1938. It burned to the ground and resumed meeting at the church [Need More] the first of six churches founded by William Rush-Plummer. The next school was built in place of the damaged one and used from 1946 to 1981.

The original Douglass High school was closed due to low attendance after many of the children from the community had grown up and moved away. In an old community, Douglass High School did not have enough students available to keep the school open. The building was listed on the National Register of Historic Places in 1998. It was torn down without the consent of the Rush-Plummer family in the Summer of 2006. Rush-Family member and the Great Granddaughter, Maggie Judith Fluker-Campbell, of William Rush Plummer, the founder of the school, opposed to the destruction of this "National Register of Historic Places', Landmark. But alumni members of Douglass High School pushed forward with the demolishing the original school without consulting with Pastor Maggie Fluker [Plummer]-Campbell under the direction of the School Superintendent at that time to make way for a new school.

The new Douglass School opened for the 2008–09 school year, with an expected enrollment of at least 800 students. The New Frederick Douglass High School opened under the leadership of Janet Ware Thompson, a 1975 graduate of Douglass High School. It is one of the oldest but newest Memphis City Schools, with a state-of-the-art 1,500-seat varsity gym, a 1,100-seat auditorium, a football stadium (with a track) in the middle of Douglass Park, and baseball stadium at the northeast corner of Douglass Park.

Among the first class to graduate from the new Douglass High School is Terry E. Fluker Jr., the son of Terry E. Fluker Sr., Director of the Douglass Community Center for 32 years, retiring January 14, 2014.

Community

Recreation
Douglass Park, located behind the original and new Douglass High School, is where many children have come together since the 1960s for the Day Camp during the summer months under the direction of the late Evelyn Fluker-Williams, the Director of Douglass Park during the 1960s–1970s. In Douglass Park, children such as Bishop Maggie Campbell [Maggie-Judith Fluker], her sisters, brothers, cousins and many children from the community were taught how to play such sports as basketball, swimming lessons, tennis, children's theatre, arts, and crafts, and they competed against other Parks in Memphis. A women's rights activist, Election Poll Supervisor, and a very patriotic leader, Director Evelyn Fluker-Williams required the children to fully participate in the Flag Ceremony daily and work at the Election polls including Bishop Maggie Campbell.

Part-time employee of the Community Center worker Evelyn Fluker-Williams worked indoors in the Fall and Winter months at Douglass Community Center where her children and those within the community learned indoor sports, arts and craft, straight pool, bumper pool, table tennis, card, and board games, basketball, Girl and Boy Scout Troop meetings, piano lessons and they competed against other community centers in the City of Memphis.

Part-time worker Evelyn Fluker-Williams helped coordinate the annual Douglass Expo in Douglass Park each year until the late 1970s. Celebrations such as Juneteenth are now held in Douglass Park which has changed dramatically since the 1960s and 1970s.

Community Center
Part-time worker, Evelyn Fluker-Williams worked indoors in the Fall and Winter months at Douglass Community Center from the 1960s through the 1970s where her children and those within the community learned indoor sports, arts and craft, straight pool, bumper pool, table tennis, card, and board games, basketball, Girl and Boy Scout Troop meetings, piano lessons and they competed against other community centers in the City of Memphis. The Community Center has a gymnasium, banquet room, a kitchen, a game room, a multi-purpose room, a CoAct Police office, and restrooms. Terry E. Fluker Sr. succeeded his mother, Evelyn Fluker-Williams as the part-time worker of the Douglass Community Center for more than 15 years.

A talented athlete, Terry E. Fluker Sr. was appointed Most Valuable Player for throughout his high school years in Basketball. He is also a baseball player and a coach. He attended Alcorn State University on a baseball scholarship of which he earned from his outstanding performances while attending the original Douglass High School.

Terry E. Fluker Sr. was inducted into the Memphis Amateur Sports Hall of Fame under the heading of Youth Team Manager / Coach on December 12, 2002, along with his cousin, the late Odessa Dickens-Hayes, in the sport of golf. She also taught children how to play golf. Terry E. Fluker Sr. was also inducted into the Alcorn State University Sports Hall of Fame in the sport of baseball. He was inducted in October 2011.

Under the direction of Terry E. Fluker Sr., Douglass Community Center sponsored many events throughout the year including having a Senior Citizen's group as part of his activities, Cheerleading, Majorettes, Dance, Physical Fitness, Summer R.B.I. Baseball program - sponsored by the Memphis Red Birds, Drawing, Coloring, Tumbling, and little league games in flag football, basketball, and baseball as part of his program as Director from the year 2000 - 2014 at Douglass Community Center with a total 3 years part-time in park and recreation and 32 years as a full-time director.

Terry E. Fluker Sr. retired on January 14, 2014, after serving 32 years of City of Memphis Parks and Neighborhoods Division. Terry Fluker Sr. is currently a volunteer coach for the New, Douglass High School varsity baseball team. He is also a member of the Men's Senior Baseball League for 40 plus-year-old baseball players.

Economy
Douglass has several different factories in the area as well; some are still active while others are not, and all are tied into a rail line connecting several factories' docking areas including John Morrell Meats (now a subsidiary of Smithfield Foods). Douglass borders Hyde Park and Hollywood and is surrounded by railroad tracks to the north, south and east. For many years, residents could not leave the community most days of the week without being blocked in by stalled railroad cars or slow mile long cars day after day. Many residents have had bad experiences crossing the tracks by foot and by auto. Many accidents over the years have been documented. Though promises were made to build an overpass as far back as the early 1970s, this project never materialized.

References

Neighborhoods in Memphis, Tennessee